Artyk is a village in Kaka District, Ahal Province, Turkmenistan.

It is primarily noteworthy as a border crossing into Iran at Lotfabad, one of three such crossings in Ahal Province.

Etymology
The word artyk means "excess" in Turkmen. It was the name of one of the first settlers in this area.

References

Populated places in Ahal Region